The Rinkeby murder took place on 26 February 2002, when 19-year-old Radu Acsinia was shot to death at Rinkeby station on the Stockholm metro, Sweden.

On 23 October 2002, the Svea Court of Appeal in Stockholm found four young men jointly guilty of the murder. The two youngest offenders were each sentenced to four years' youth custody, while the remaining two –  brothers Önder Yildiz (then aged 20 years) and Özkan Yildiz (24) – were given prison terms of 10 years and life respectively.

The legal case has attracted much attention and been described by Chancellor of Justice, Göran Lambertz, as yet another case that shakes confidence in the judicial system. The Rinkeby Murder Committee – a volunteer network pressing for a retrial of Önder and Özkan Yildiz – was set up by Olle Schubert and Henrik Westander in 2006.

In June 2009, lawyer Claes Borgström, representing Özkan, submitted a petition for a new trial to the Supreme Court of Sweden. It appears that, among other things, a number of eyewitnesses have come forward with information that Önder and Özkan Yilmaz were not at the scene of the murder. In 2009 a key prosecution witness also said that he had made false statements about Önder and Özkan Yildiz during the trial.

On 14 September 2009, the Supreme Court decided that the Office of the Prosecutor-General should express its opinion on the case.

The book Three Brothers (2005), by Christian Holmén and Dick Sundevall, deals with the Rinkeby murder.

References 

2002 in Sweden
2002 murders in Sweden
2000s in Stockholm
Crime in Stockholm